Maroilles is a commune in the Nord department, northern France.

Heraldry

See also
Communes of the Nord department
 Maroilles (cheese)

References

Communes of Nord (French department)